Filipino band IV of Spades has released one studio album, twelve singles, four promotional singles and eleven music videos. The group consist of vocalist and bassist Zild Benitez, vocalist and lead guitarist Blaster Silonga, and drummer Badjao de Castro.

Albums

Studio albums

Singles

As lead artist

Promotional singles

Guest appearances

Music videos

Notes

References

External links
 Official website
 IV of Spades at AllMusic
 
 

Discographies of Filipino artists
Pop music group discographies
Rock music group discographies